Al-Okhdood Club is a Saudi Arabian football club based in Najran, in the southern region of Saudi Arabia. Founded in 1976, the club competes in the MS League, the second tier of Saudi football. The club have won the Saudi Second Division twice in 1992 and most recently in 2021. Besides football, the club also consists of various other departments including karate, handball, taekwondo, volleyball, water polo, basketball and cycling.

Honours
Saudi Second Division (Level 3)
Winners (2): 1991–92, 2020–21

Saudi Third Division (Level 4)
Winners (2): 2003–04, 2017–18

Current squad 
As of 1 July 2021:

References

External links

Okhdood
Okhdood
Okhdood
Okhdood